Connecticut's 19th State Senate district elects one member of the Connecticut State Senate. It currently consists of the communities of Columbia, Franklin, Lebanon, Hebron, Ledyard, Lisbon, Marlborough, Norwich, Sprague, and part of Montville. It is currently represented by Democrat Cathy Osten, who has served since 2013.

Recent elections

2020

2016

2016

2014

2012

References

19